Saidul Anam Tutul (died on 18 December 2018) was a Bangladeshi drama and film director. He started his career as a film editor. He won Bangladesh National Film Award for Best Editing for the film Surja Dighal Bari (1979).

Filmography

Director
 Adhiyar (2003)

Editor

Television

Drama

TV programs 
 Royel Tiger Nattojuddyo - as a judge.

Awards
 Bangladesh National Film Award for Best Editing (1979)
 Fazlul Haque Memorial Award as film director in 2004.

Personal life and death
Tutul was married to Mobashwera Khanam. Together they had two daughters, Oishi and Amrita. Tutul died at LAB Aid Hospital in Dhaka on 18 December 2018 after a heart attack.

References

External links
 

2018 deaths
Bangladeshi film directors
Best Editor National Film Award (Bangladesh) winners
Burials at Mirpur Martyred Intellectual Graveyard
Best Film Directing Meril-Prothom Alo Critics Choice Award winners